The canton of Plaine de l'Agoût is an administrative division of the Tarn department, southern France. It was created at the French canton reorganisation which came into effect in March 2015. Its seat is in Sémalens.

It consists of the following communes:
 
Brousse
Cabanès
Carbes
Cuq
Damiatte
Fiac
Fréjeville
Jonquières
Laboulbène
Guitalens-L'Albarède
Lautrec
Magrin
Montdragon
Montpinier
Peyregoux
Prades
Pratviel
Puycalvel
Saint-Genest-de-Contest
Saint-Julien-du-Puy
Saint-Paul-Cap-de-Joux
Sémalens
Serviès
Teyssode
Vénès
Vielmur-sur-Agout
Viterbe

References

Cantons of Tarn (department)